Franck Pourcel (14 August 1913 – 12 November 2000) was a French composer, arranger, and conductor of popular and classical music.

Biography

Early life 
Born in Marseille, France, Pourcel started learning the violin at the age of six.  Later, Pourcel studied violin at the Conservatoire in Marseille, and also drums because he loved jazz, and spent a year in Paris at the Conservatoire.

By 1931, he was working as a violinist in several theaters in Marseille, marrying Odette eight years later. He then became the musical director for Lucienne Boyer, with whom he went on a world tour.

Career: recording
He immigrated to the United States in 1952 but returned to France the following year to record "Blue Tango" and the follow-up "Limelight". In 1954, Pourcel recorded his first album on the Pathé-Marconi record label, with whom he would record a total of nine albums in a three-year period. In 1956, he recorded his version of The Platters hit "Only You", which sold over three million copies by 1959, and was awarded a gold disc. It peaked at number 9 on the United States Billboard pop chart during a 16 weeks chart run.

Succès de Films, orchestra instrumental album

Conducting
Between 1956 and 1972, he was the conductor for France at the Eurovision Song Contest, with the exceptions of 1957 and 1968. Four of the songs that he conducted won first place for France. As a result, France became the most successful country in the contest's early years, until Luxembourg matched its four wins in 1973.

By 1958, Pourcel started recording classical music.  His series of Pages Célèbres led him to conduct the London Symphony Orchestra, The Society of Concerts for the Conservatoire, The BBC Orchestra at the Royal Festival Hall, and the Lamoureux Orchestra at the Salle Pleyel in Paris. In 1961, he co-composed with Paul Mauriat the hit "Chariot", which was recorded by Petula Clark and followed up by Peggy March as "I Will Follow Him". The song became the main theme for the film, Sister Act.

In 1975, at the request of Air France, Pourcel composed an anthem for their new supersonic plane, Concorde.

Pourcel recorded 250 albums, over 3000 songs, and he conducted famous orchestras such as London Symphonic Orchestra, BBC Orchestra and Orchestre des concerts Lamoureux. He created the series Amour Danse et violons (54 albums) and the classical series Pages Célébres. His first recordings from 1956 to 1962 were released under the series Originals.
 
Pourcel recorded until 1995 with EMI.   

He died on 12 November 2000 in Neuilly-sur-Seine, at the age of 87, from Parkinson's disease. His daughter Françoise Pourcel, is taking care of his musical legacy.

Awards
He was rewarded with the following distinctions:
1956: The Grand prix du disque Français
1957: The Grand prix du disque in Brazil
1963: The Golden disc in Venezuela Discomoda
1965: Amsterdam: The Edison Prize for his orchestrations of pop music
1966: Gold record for his sales in France
1968: Golden disc in Colombia for Disco Mundo
1969: Grand Prix du disque of the Charles Cros Academy in Paris
1969: Gold record in Japan for the album Continental Tango
1970: Gold record in Japan for album Adoro, featuring "Adoro"
1972: Tokyo Music Festival; Arranger award
1973: Guacaipuro de Oro in Venezuela
1973: Gold record in Japan for the album For Your Lovely Baby

References

External links
Official website
 

1913 births
2000 deaths
Easy listening musicians
French musicians
Eurovision Song Contest conductors
France in the Eurovision Song Contest
French male conductors (music)
Neurological disease deaths in France
Deaths from Parkinson's disease
20th-century French conductors (music)
20th-century French male musicians